Laura Bettinson (born 20 September 1987), also known by her stage names FEMME and lau.ra, is an English singer, songwriter, producer and DJ. She started writing music at 16, gigging around the Midlands area before moving to London to study Bmus Popular Music at Goldsmiths, University of London.

History 
Bettinson grew up in Dunchurch just outside Rugby, Warwickshire, where she attended Rugby High School for Girls. Her father is the West End theatre director and writer Rob Bettinson. In 2003, aged 16, she won the Coventry and Warwickshire Teen Idol competition.

She started performing as "Dimbleby & Capper" in 2008, under which name she performed on the BBC Introducing stage at Glastonbury Festival in 2009.

It was during this period she met Radiohead producer Nigel Godrich and drummer Joey Waronker, and then went on to front their side project Ultraísta, whose debut self-titled album was released in the UK on 15 October and on 2 October in the US.

In 2013 Bettinson returned to solo work under the pseudonym "FEMME", her first single release, consisting of double A side "Educated" and "Double Trouble", was released 22 July 2013 through Tape Rec.

In November 2012 Vogue named her the "Artist of the Week" and in January 2013 Terra listed her as one of "the most interesting women in music right now" alongside such artists as Grimes and MIA.

Her second single, also a double A side, "Fever Boy" and "Heartbeat", was released on 25 November 2013 and accompanied with a launch event at the long running White Heat club night at Madame Jojo's, in Soho, London.

Musical style 
She has been described as "synth textured and bassy heavy electro-pop".

Discography

Albums and EPs
Debutante (2016)
Debutante Remixed (2017)
2.0 EP (2018)

Singles

References

External links
Official lau.ra website
Official FEMME website
Official Ultraista website
Laura Bettinson's Tape Rec profile

1987 births
Living people
English songwriters
People from Rugby, Warwickshire
Alumni of Goldsmiths, University of London
English women in electronic music
British hip hop singers
21st-century English women singers
21st-century English singers
People educated at Rugby High School for Girls